Aoife Doyle is a singer, musician and songwriter from Wicklow, Ireland. She has released three albums, This Time The Dream's On Me (2013), Clouds (2017) and Infinitely Clear (2022).

References 

Irish musicians
Irish songwriters
Irish singers
People from Wicklow (town)

Year of birth missing (living people)
Living people